The pyramid of Senusret II (in ancient Egyptian Kha Senusret meaning Senusret Shines) at El Lahun is the pyramid complex constructed for the pharaoh Senusret II in the Twelfth Dynasty.

Location and early excavation 

Karl Richard Lepsius visited the pyramid in the 1840s and conducted a brief archaeological survey of the site. Fifty years later, Flinders Petrie conducted the first comprehensive excavations there. Petrie spent several unsuccessful months searching for the entrance into the pyramid on the north face of the pyramid. Senusret II had, however, taken a complete departure from the usual practice of having a corridor on the north side  typical of Old Kingdom and early Middle Kingdom pyramids  and had instead built a narrow, vertical entrance shaft under a princess' tomb located about a dozen yards off to east of the southern pyramid face. The Czech Egyptologist Miroslav Verner explains that the decision had been made for a combination of religious reasons, and to thwart grave robbers. The builders had even constructed the usual small chapel on the north face, which typically concealed the entrance. Petrie did eventually find the entrance, after many months and multiple failed attempts.

A small team headed by N. B. Millet of the Royal Ontario Museum and the architect J. E. Knudstad has been working at the site of the pyramid town and pyramid since 1989. Their goal is to expand on Petrie's work by re-gathering architectural details of the monuments there, which Petrie had neglected to record in his reports.

On 28 June 2019, the pyramid was opened to visitors for the first time since its discovery.

Mortuary complex

Main pyramid 
The core of the pyramid was constructed from mudbrick around a stump of four steps of yellow limestone. The builders utilized a rock outcropping to anchor the pyramid and reduce construction time and cost. The completed pyramid was originally encased in white limestone, though an inscription found by Petrie indicates that the casing was removed in the Nineteenth Dynasty for reuse in a different structure built by Ramesses II. Only remnants of the black granite pyramidion, which topped the pyramid, have been found. The pyramid was protected from flooding by a trench surrounding the perimeter of the pyramid and filled with sand to absorb rainwater. Around this trench, a stone perimeter wall was built and decorated with deep niches.

Substructure 
Typically, the substructure entry was located on the north face of the pyramid. This had been the traditional entry point since Djoser built his step pyramid in the Third Dynasty. Although Senusret II's pyramid was built with a north chapel included, its real entry was hidden-away under the floor of a princess' tomb to the south-east. This was used for the burial rites of the king, but was too narrow for use during construction. This was then reworked into a fake burial chamber in an attempt to deceive thieves attempting to enter the king's tomb.

The base of the construction shaft opens up into a vaulted horizontal corridor. The corridor runs north to a vaulted room, containing the real entry shaft and a second unexplored shaft that has been flooded by ground water. The corridor then continues north with a slight incline leading to the antechamber. Part way along, a second chamber is found in its west. The antechamber contained two passageways: one leads from the antechamber to the burial chamber directly west; the other, located in the south, leads around the chamber eventually entering it from the north. The winding passage may have served a symbolic purpose, allowing the king's spirit to leave the chamber towards the north. The burial chamber and labyrinth of passageways were shifted south-east of the vertical axis of the pyramid, another deviation from the standard.

The burial chamber is oriented on the east–west axis, has a vaulted ceiling made from granite blocks, and a red granite sarcophagus near its west wall. Despite the precautions taken, the burial chamber was found looted of most of its contents by Petrie. An alabaster offering table inscribed with Senusret II's name, a gold uraeus, and leg bones, believed to belong to the king, are all that remained of the burial.

See also 
 List of Egyptian pyramids
 Egyptian pyramid construction techniques

Notes

References

Sources

Excavation reports 
 William Matthew Flinders Petrie: Illahun, Kahun and Gurob. 1889–1890. Nutt, London 1891 (Onlineversion).
 William Matthew Flinders Petrie, Guy Brunton, Margaret Alice Murray: Lahun II. British School of Archaeology in Egypt and Bernard Quaritch, London 1923 (PDF; 12,9 MB).

Pyramids of the Twelfth Dynasty of Egypt